Muishiki no Iro (無意識の色 Unconscious Color) is the 22nd single from Japanese idol girl group SKE48, being released on . The song reached number one on the Oricon Weekly Singles Chart, selling 278,892 copies in the first week. It also reached number one on the Billboard Japan Hot 100. This is also the first single since "1!2!3!4! YOROSHIKU!" to release a full MV until "Stand by You".

This is the first single since "12gatsu no Kangaroo" to not have a graduation-themed B-side. Also, for this single, Love Crescendo added 4 new members (Isshiki Rena, Inoue Ruka, Nomura Miyo, and Matsumoto Chikako) to their sub-unit; they now have 11 members.

Track listing

Type A

Type B

Type C

Type D

Theater version

Personnel

"Muishiki no Iro (Senbatsu)" 
The performers of the main single are:
Team S: Kitagawa Ryoha, Jurina Matsui
Team KII: Ego Yuna, Oba Mina, Obata Yuna, Kitano Ruka, Souda Sarina, Takayanagi Akane, Takeuchi Saki, Hidaka Yuzuki, Furuhata Nao
Team E: Kamata Natsuki, Kumazaki Haruka, Goto Rara, Sugawara Maya, Suda Akari

"Hanshateki Through" 
"Hanshateki Through" was performed by Love Crescendo, consisting of:
Team S: Isshiki Rena, Inoue Ruka, Kitagawa Ryoha, Nomura Miyo, Matsumoto Chikako, Matsui Jurina
Team KII: Ego Yuna, Obata Yuna
Team E: Kumazaki Haruka, Goto Rara, Sugawara Maya

"Yoake no Coyote" 
"Yoake no Coyote" was performed by the SKE48 grouping Sagami Chain Senbatsu, consisting of:
Team S: Kitagawa Ryoha, Matsui Jurina
Team KII: Ego Yuna, Oba Mina, Obata Yuna, Souda Sarina, Takayanagi Akane, Furuhata Nao, Yahagi Yukina
Team E: Kumazaki Haruka, Goto Rara, Suda Akari

"Bocchi de Skip" 
"Bocchi de Skip" was performed by the SKE48 grouping Namae Yobaretai, consisting of:
Team KII: Aoki Shiori, Uchiyama Mikoto, Kitano Ruka, Hidaka Yuzuki
Team E: Ichino Narumi, Saito Makiko

"Sawaranu Romance" 
"Sawaranu Romance" was performed by the SKE48 grouping Sakura Love Letter 32, consisting of:
Team S: Kamimura Ayuka, Kitagawa Yoshino, Sugiyama Aika, Nojima Kano, Machi Otoha
Team KII: Arai Yuki, Ota Ayaka, Kataoka Narumi, Shirai Kotono, Takatsuka Natsuki, Mizuno Airi, Yahagi Yukina
Team E: Aikawa Honoka, Asai Yuka, Ida Reona, Sato Kaho, Suenaga Oka, Takahata Yuki, Fukushi Nao
Kenkyuusei: Atsumi Ayaha, Ishikawa Saki, Ishiguro Yuzuki, Oshiba Rinka, Okada Miku, Kurashima Ami, Sakamoto Marin, Shirayuki Kohaku, Nakamura Izumi, Nonogaki Miki, Fukai Negai, Morihira Riko, Wada Aina

"We're Growing Up" 
"We're Growing Up" was performed by the SKE48 grouping Aichi Toyota Senbatsu, consisting of:
Team S: Kitagawa Ryoha, Matsui Jurina
Team KII: Ego Yuna, Oba Mina, Obata Yuna, Souda Sarina, Takayanagi Akane, Furuhata Nao
Team E: Kumazaki Haruka, Goto Rara, Sugawara Maya, Suda Akari

"Because Docchitsukazu" 
"Because Docchitsukazu" was performed by the SKE48 grouping Kosanger 7, consisting of:
Team S: Inuzuka Asana, Tsuzuki Rika, Yamauchi Suzuran, Yamada Juna
Team KII: Takagi Yumana, Matsumura Kaori
Team E: Tani Marika

Release history

References 

SKE48 songs
2018 singles
2018 songs
Songs written by Yasushi Akimoto
Oricon Weekly number-one singles
Billboard Japan Hot 100 number-one singles